Jack Franklin Whillock (November 4, 1942 – December 20, 2021) was a right-handed Major League Baseball pitcher who spent seven games with the Detroit Tigers in 1971.

He graduated from Clinton, Arkansas High School and played baseball for the Arkansas Razorbacks. 

After graduating from the University of Arkansas, Whillock was signed by the St. Louis Cardinals prior to the 1964 season. In October 1968, he was released by the Cardinals, and sometime before the 1969 season he was signed by the Tigers. He made his major league debut with the Tigers on August 29, 1971 at the age of 28. He made seven relief appearances for them, going 0-2 with a 5.63 ERA, allowing ten hits and two walks in eight innings of work. On September 21 he appeared in his final game.

On January 22, 1973, he was traded by the Tigers to the Montreal Expos for minor leaguer Don Koonce.

Though his time in the major leagues was short, his minor league career lasted eleven seasons, from 1964 to 1974. Over the course of his minor league career, Whillock went 63-76 with a 3.46 ERA, appearing in 391 games and starting 97 of them. In 1971, with the Montgomery Rebels, Whillock went 5-2 with a 1.19 ERA in 37 relief appearances. The following year, he went 6-4 with a 2.40 ERA in 45 relief appearances with the Toledo Mud Hens.

Willock died on December 20, 2021.

References

External links
Baseball Reference Major League Stats

1942 births
2021 deaths
People from Clinton, Arkansas
Detroit Tigers players
St. Petersburg Cardinals players
Oklahoma City 89ers players
Peninsula Whips players
Tulsa Oilers (baseball) players
Cedar Rapids Cardinals players
Modesto Reds players
Rock Hill Cardinals players
Toledo Mud Hens players
Montgomery Rebels players
Arkansas Travelers players
Winnipeg Goldeyes players
Baseball players from Arkansas